The Woman Hater is a 1925 American silent drama film directed by James Flood and starring Helene Chadwick, Clive Brook, and John Harron. It was produced and distributed by Warner Bros.

Plot
As described in a film magazine review, Miles, lover of Marie Lamont, leaves her because he believes her to be untrue. She rises to fame as an actress and infatuates the youthful Philip Tranter. Philip’s mother begs Miles to save Philip from the woman. Miles succeeds in having Marie break several engagements with Philip. Philip, unable to restrain himself, breaks into Marie’s apartment and finds her in the arms of Miles. He threatens them both with a gun. Marie declares that she was only playing with Miles, and thus saves him. Philip, certain that she does not love him, also leaves. Marie dashes across New York in  her car, stops Miles as he is boarding a ship, and they declare their mutual love.

Cast
 Helene Chadwick as Marie Lamont, the Actress  
 Clive Brook as Miles, the Woman-hater  
 John Harron as Philip Tranter, the Millionaire  
 Helen Dunbar as Mrs. Tranter  
 Dale Fuller as Secretary

Preservation
A print of The Woman Hater is housed at the French archive Centre national du cinéma et de l'image animée in Fort de Bois-d'Arcy.

References

Bibliography
 Monaco, James. The Encyclopedia of Film. Perigee Books, 1991.

External links

1925 films
1925 drama films
Silent American drama films
Films directed by James Flood
American silent feature films
1920s English-language films
American black-and-white films
Surviving American silent films
1920s American films